Julian Abele Cook Jr. (June 22, 1930 – May 16, 2017) was a United States district judge of the United States District Court for the Eastern District of Michigan.

Education and career

Born in Washington, D.C., Cook was the son and only child of African-American architect Julian Abele Cook and Ruth McNeil.  Cook received a Bachelor of Arts degree from Pennsylvania State University in 1952. He served as officer in the signal corps of the United States Army from 1952 to 1954. He received a Juris Doctor from Georgetown University Law Center in 1957. He was a law clerk for Judge Arthur E. Moore in Pontiac, Michigan from 1957 to 1958. He was in private practice in Detroit, Michigan from 1958 to 1961, and in Pontiac and Bloomfield Hills, Michigan from 1961 to 1978. He was a Special Assistant State Attorney General of Michigan from 1968 until his appointment to the federal bench in 1978.

Federal judicial service

On July 25, 1978, President Jimmy Carter nominated Cook to a seat vacated by Judge Lawrence Gubow on the United States District Court for the Eastern District of Michigan. Cook was confirmed by the United States Senate on September 22, 1978, and received his commission on September 23, 1978. He served as Chief Judge from 1989 to 1996. He assumed senior status on December 30, 1996, serving in that status until his death.

Death

Cook died in his home in Silver Spring, Maryland on May 16, 2017.

See also 
 List of African-American federal judges
 List of African-American jurists

References

Sources
 

1930 births
2017 deaths
Lawyers from Detroit
Lawyers from Washington, D.C.
Military personnel from Washington, D.C.
Michigan Democrats
Judges of the United States District Court for the Eastern District of Michigan
African-American judges
Georgetown University Law Center alumni
Pennsylvania State University alumni
United States Army officers
United States district court judges appointed by Jimmy Carter
20th-century American judges